Shushil Kumar Shakya is an Indian politician and a member of 17th Legislative Assembly, Uttar Pradesh of India. He represents the Amritpur constituency in Farrukhabad district of Uttar Pradesh.

Political career
Sushil Kumar Shakya contested Uttar Pradesh Assembly Election as Bharatiya Janata Party candidate and defeated her close contestant Narendra Singh Yadav from Samajwadi Party with a margin of 40,507 votes.

Posts held

References

People from Farrukhabad district
Bharatiya Janata Party politicians from Uttar Pradesh
Living people
Uttar Pradesh MLAs 2017–2022
Year of birth missing (living people)